Luis Alejandro Rubén de Agustini Varela (born April 5, 1976), known simply as Luis de Agustini, is a footballer who played as a goalkeeper for Plaza Colonia in the Uruguayan Segunda División.

He formerly played for Al-Ittihad. Born in Uruguay, he represented the Libya national team.

Personal life 
De Agustini was born in Sauce, a city located in the Uruguayan Department of Canelones.

Honours

Club 
Peñarol
 Copa Uruguaya: 1999

Liverpool Montevideo
 Uruguayan Segunda División: 2002

Al-Ittihad
 Libyan Premier League: 2002–03, 2005–06
 Libyan Super Cup: 2003

Individual 
Goalkeeper with the fewest goals conceded in a season of the Libyan Premier League: 2002–03

Trivia 
 De Agustini is the first footballer of Libyan nationality to play in the Copa Sudamericana.

References

External links 

  
  
 Player profile with Photo – Sporting-heroes.net 
 Player Profile – MTN African Cup of Nation 2006 
 Player profile – TD.com 

1976 births
Living people
People from Canelones Department
Naturalized citizens of Libya
Libyan footballers
Libya international footballers
2006 Africa Cup of Nations players
Libyan expatriate footballers
Expatriate footballers in Uruguay
Peñarol players
Deportes Concepción (Chile) footballers
Liverpool F.C. (Montevideo) players
Libyan people of Italian descent
Libyan people of Uruguayan descent
Uruguayan footballers
Uruguayan expatriates in Chile
Uruguayan people of Italian descent
Expatriate footballers in Chile
Association football goalkeepers
Expatriate footballers in Libya
Al-Ittihad Club (Tripoli) players
Libyan Premier League players